Summers–Longley Building, also known as the Grace Building, is a historic double house located at South Bend, St. Joseph County, Indiana. It was built in 1910, and is a two-story, Classical Revival red brick building with limestone trim. It features a recessed central entrance. The building was originally built as a double house, but has been converted to commercial uses.

It was listed on the National Register of Historic Places in 1985.

References

Houses on the National Register of Historic Places in Indiana
Neoclassical architecture in Indiana
Houses completed in 1910
Buildings and structures in South Bend, Indiana
National Register of Historic Places in St. Joseph County, Indiana